Halse is a village and civil parish in Somerset, England, situated  north west of Taunton in the Somerset West and Taunton district.  The village has a population of 290.

History

The name of the village derives from the Old English heals meaning a neck of land.

The parish of Halse was part of the Williton and Freemanners Hundred.

After the Norman Conquest the manor was granted to Robert Arundel who subsequently gave it to the Hospitallers of St John of Jerusalem in 1152, who held it through Buckland Priory in Durston until the dissolution of the monasteries, when it reverted to the Crown. 

The estate was sold to the Hawley family in 1545, and they held it until 1652, when Sir Francis Hawley sold it to the Wescombe family. It was later held successively by the Granger, Webber, Prior and Goldney families, before the estate was broken up in 1939.

Governance

The parish council has responsibility for local issues, including setting an annual precept (local rate) to cover the council's operating costs and producing annual accounts for public scrutiny. The parish council evaluates local planning applications and works with the local police, district council officers, and neighbourhood watch groups on matters of crime, security, and traffic. The parish council's role also includes initiating projects for the maintenance and repair of parish facilities, as well as consulting with the district council on the maintenance, repair, and improvement of highways, drainage, footpaths, public transport, and street cleaning. Conservation matters (including trees and listed buildings) and environmental issues are also the responsibility of the council.

The village falls within the non-metropolitan district of Somerset West and Taunton, which was established on 1 April 2019. It was previously in the district of Taunton Deane, which was formed on 1 April 1974 under the Local Government Act 1972, and part of Taunton Rural District before that. The district council is responsible for local planning and building control, local roads, council housing, environmental health, markets and fairs, refuse collection and recycling, cemeteries and crematoria, leisure services, parks, and tourism.

Somerset County Council is responsible for running the largest and most expensive local services such as education, social services, libraries, main roads, public transport, policing and fire services, trading standards, waste disposal and strategic planning.

It is also part of the Taunton Deane county constituency represented in the House of Commons of the Parliament of the United Kingdom. It elects one member of parliament (MP) by the first past the post system of election.

Religious sites

The village is served by a Norman church of St James the Less.

Notable residents

Author and scriptwriter Jonathan Morris lived in the village from 1975 to 1993.

References

External links

 Halse Village website

Villages in Taunton Deane
Civil parishes in Somerset